Belcaire is a commune in the Aude department, part of the ancient Languedoc province and the present-day Occitanie region in southern France.

Population

See also
Communes of the Aude department

References

Communes of Aude
Aude communes articles needing translation from French Wikipedia